Artur Guliev (born 5 August 1997) is an Uzbekistani sprint canoeist.

He won a medal at the 2019 ICF Canoe Sprint World Championships.

References

1997 births
Living people
ICF Canoe Sprint World Championships medalists in Canadian
Sportspeople from Tashkent
Uzbekistani male canoeists
Asian Games medalists in canoeing
Canoeists at the 2018 Asian Games
Asian Games silver medalists for Uzbekistan
Medalists at the 2018 Asian Games
21st-century Uzbekistani people